1936 in professional wrestling describes the year's events in the world of professional wrestling.

List of notable promoters/promotions 
These promoters and promotions held notable shows in 1936.

Calendar of notable shows

Accomplishments and tournaments

Championship changes

AFW

AWA

CSAC

DWU

EMLL

GAC

MWA

NWA

NYSAC

SFBO

SPWA

Stadiums Limited

WAC

Unknown
World championships

Regional championships

Arts and entertainment
June 5   The Seattle Post-Intelligencer publishes an advertisement for White Owl Cigar featuring Gus Sonnenberg, Yvon Robert, Chief Little Wolf, and Ernie Dusek.

Debuts
Debut date uncertain:
Whipper Billy Watson

Births
Date of birth uncertain:
Eddie Morrow
January 3  Eddie Einhorn (died in 2016) 
January 13  Buddy Colt (died in 2021) 
February 4  Eddie Sharkey
February 16  Murray Weideman (died in 2021) 
March 1  Ricky Hunter (died in 2022) 
March 11  Pat Barrett (died in 2021)
March 21  Beverly Shade
April 13  Dr. Wagner(died in 2004)
April 29  Beauregard
June 18  Larry Hennig(died in 2018)
June 25  Halcón Suriano(died in 1993)
June 28  Cowboy Bob Kelly (died in 2014) 
July 5  Wayne Bridges (died in 2020) 
August 20  Irma González
September 20  Pepper Martin (died in 2022)
October 5  Black Gordman
October 20  Emile Dupre
November 2  Archie Gouldie(died in 2016)
December 18  Malcolm Kirk(died in 1987)

Deaths
January 1  Cowboy Russell (40)
June  Steve Znoski (28)
June 19  Jim Browning (wrestler) (33)
June 25  Mike Romano (40)

References
General

Specific

 
professional wrestling